Gardner Township is located in Sangamon County, Illinois. As of the 2010 census, its population was 4,245 and it contained 1,732 housing units.  The township contains the unincorporated communities of Bradfordton and Salisbury.

The township annexed the western half of Salisbury Township in 1989, thereby taking in the unincorporated village of Salisbury and increasing in size.

Geography

Demographics

References

External links
City-data.com
Illinois State Archives

Townships in Sangamon County, Illinois
Springfield metropolitan area, Illinois
Townships in Illinois